Monument Valley Film, Blues & Arts Festival is an annual film festival held in Kayenta, Arizona.  Established in 2007 by filmmakers Shonie and Andee De La Rosa. They are most known prior for their collaborate effort in the groundbreaking documentary film "G" (2004) and the release of their first full-length feature film Mile Post 398 (2007). It is the only film festival of its kind on the Navajo Nation currently to date.

See also
 "G"
 Mile Post 398
 Native American films

External links

Navajo culture
Native American film festivals
Native American history of Arizona
Film festivals in Arizona
2007 establishments in Arizona
Film festivals established in 2007
History of Navajo County, Arizona